The superior gluteal veins (gluteal veins) are venæ comitantes of the superior gluteal artery. They receive tributaries from the buttock corresponding with the branches of the artery. They enter the pelvis through the greater sciatic foramen, superior to the piriformis. They drain into internal iliac vein (often uniting to drain as a single trunk).

References 

Veins of the torso